The 137th Rifle Division was an infantry division of the Red Army in World War II. Raised in 1939 as a standard Red Army rifle division, it served for the duration of the Great Patriotic War in that role. The division fought in the central part of the Soviet-German front. It shared credit with other formations for the liberation of Bobruisk during Operation Bagration, and ended the war in the conquest of East Prussia.

Formation 
The division was organized at Gorkiy in the Moscow Military District in September 1939, based on a cadre from the 51st Rifle Regiment of the 17th Rifle Division, as part of the major pre-World War II mobilization of the Red Army. On June 22, 1941, its order of battle was as follows:
 409th Rifle Regiment
 624th Rifle Regiment
 771st Rifle Regiment
 278th Light Artillery Regiment
 497th Howitzer Regiment
 169th Sapper Battalion
 238th Antitank Battalion
 176th Reconnaissance Company
 122nd Signal Company
 179th Medical-Sanitation Battalion
Kombrig Sergei Evlampeivich Danilov, who had been the commanding officer of the 97th Rifle Regiment, served as commander of the division until he was promoted and succeeded by Col. Ivan Tikonovich Grishin in late October 1940. Grishin remained in command until Mar. 17, 1942, and went on to command the 49th Army.

On June 25, the division was subordinated to 20th Army's 20th Rifle Corps, part of the Reserve of the Supreme High Command. Beginning on June 26, the division was transferred to Orsha. The first trains carrying men of the 771st Rifle Reg't. arrived there on June 29. At the beginning of July, the division was subordinated to the 13th Army. The division was also transferred to the 61st Rifle Corps. It held positions at Ponizova (south of Orsha) and on the Dniepr, a front of 20 kilometers. On July 5, the division's 176th Reconnaissance Company, operating in advance of the division at Borisov, was heavily assaulted by German tanks and withdrew to the Dniepr. On July 8, the division was ordered to move east and hold positions on the Resta River. However, the division at this point had only the 771st Rifle Regiment, elements of the 624th Rifle Regiment and the two artillery regiments actually at the front; the transports of the 409th Rifle Regiment and the remainder of the 624th were still approaching Krichev, and later joined the 7th Airborne Brigade (4th Airborne Corps). The division's antiaircraft artillery battalion was heavily bombed by German aircraft and ceased to exist as an effective combat unit. The medical battalion reached Roslavl and was attached to a different unit.

Battle of Smolensk 
On July 10, German troops of the 2nd Panzer Group crossed the Dniepr and seized a bridgehead. The 137th Rifle Division was ordered to counterattack and eliminate the bridgehead, beginning its involvement in the Battle of Smolensk. On July 11, the division began the march westward to the line of Dubrovka, Volkovichi and Usushek. The division was re-subordinated to the 45th Rifle Corps. By July 13, the division was at the starting line for the attack. The immediate objective was to capture Seredyna-Buda, Pustoy Osovets, Chervonny Osovets and Davidovichi. On the right flank, the 132nd Rifle Division was also attacking. The 148th Rifle Division moved forward on the 137th's left. The German troops repulsed the division's attack and soon moved forward themselves. The 771st Rifle Regiment had captured Chervonny Osovets, but was forced to retreat under pressure from German tanks. The division did not retreat beyond its jumping-off line but was bypassed on the flanks by German armor.

After six weeks of heavy fighting around Smolensk, the 137th was reduced to the equivalent of only two or three rifle battalions. On or before August 21, the division was again transferred, now to 3rd Army in Bryansk Front; it would remain in that army until February 1943. A report by Lt. Gen. K.D. Golubev, commander of the 13th Army, on Aug. 21, implies that the 137th, along with three other rifle divisions, had barely escaped encirclement by running the gauntlet eastward through the advancing forces of the German XXIV Motorized Corps and were in no shape to continue active operations. What remained of the division, described as a "composite battalion" on Aug. 29, was tasked with protecting the approaches to Trubchevsk, in the army's third line of defense. By Sept. 3 its strength was reported as "one regiment, with its remaining forces and headquarters", still in the same positions. Ordered into an attack against elements of 17th Panzer Division on the 5th, the remnants of the division made no gains and, in fact ended up ceding ground. On September 7, an attack by a German motorized regiment with tanks was beaten off.

The division continued to hold in these positions until early October as the German forces carried out their encirclement of Kiev. When Operation Typhoon began in early October, 3rd Army mostly escaped being encircled in the Bryansk pocket, but still had to fall back to the east; Trubchevsk was given up on Oct. 9. The army managed to stabilize its positions between Mikhaylov and Yelets by late November, before beginning the counteroffensive against the southern flank of Army Group Center on Dec. 6. The counteroffensive ended in late winter with the 137th and its army well to the east of Oryol; it would hold these positions for nearly a year.

Second Winter Counteroffensive and Battle of Kursk 
In the winter of 1943 the 137th took part in the Voronezh-Kastornoye operation, helping to partly encircle and destroy both the German and Hungarian 2nd Armies to the west of Voronezh as part of the northern pincer of the operation. After capturing several villages on February 3, the division reached a line between Novofedorovka and Pavlovka. At around this time the division was reassigned to 48th Army; it would remain in this army for the duration, apart from a brief reassignment to Western Front in April 1944. By Feb. 9, 48th and 13th Armies were splitting German 2nd Army and 2nd Panzer Army apart; the 137th had taken the southwestern outskirts of Smirnye. The offensive slowed in late February due to German forces being evacuated from the Rzhev salient, as well as lax practices on the part of lower-level commands. On February 17, Bryansk Front reported about the 48th Army operations east of Maloarkhangelsk, admonishing lower level HQs against concentrating in the relative warmth and comfort of villages: On March 6 the division was combined with the 143rd Rifle Division to form a shock group, supported by the 28th and 30th Guards Tank Regiments, in a supporting attack along the Pokrovskoe–Oryol road, but after two days of fighting did not manage to dent the German defenses, while suffering considerable losses. The front soon went over to the defense.

Later in March the 48th Army was reassigned to Gen. K.K. Rokossovsky's Central Front. At the outset of the Battle of Kursk the 137th was a separate division, although still alongside the 143rd. 48th Army was on the right flank of its front, on the north shoulder of the Kursk salient. The main blow of the German 9th Army attack fell on the 13th Army to the west. When the German assault ran down by July 12, 48th Army was in good shape to take part in the counteroffensive towards Oryol, which continued into August.

Advance 
During September and October the 137th advanced, along with the rest of its army, in the direction of Gomel. Following the crossing of the Dnepr River and the liberation of Kiev in November, Rokossovski's Front (now named Belorussian) continued a remorseless western advance along the southern fringes of the Pripet Marshes. At around this time the division, by order of the front command, formed a separate Submachine Gun Battalion for "assault and... counterattack duties". This unit was organized as follows:

 2 submachine gun companies  (110 men each)
 1 mortar company  (9 82mm mortars)
 1 light machinegun platoon  (24 men, 8 LMGs)
 1 reconnaissance platoon  (armed with SMGs)
 1 antiaircraft platoon  (4 AAMGs)
 1 antitank platoon  (9 ATRs)

This battalion was formed from experienced "young men... from 19 to 33 years old", and was placed under command of the 771st Rifle Regiment. During the winter of 1943-44 the division also formed its own ski battalion, but this was disbanded at the end of the winter.

In January 1944, the division became part of the 42nd Rifle Corps, where it would remain for the duration. Belorussian Front was renamed 1st Belorussian in February. During the Soviet summer offensive, Operation Bagration, the 42nd Corps was concentrated north of Rogachev to assist its partner 29th Rifle Corps and units of the 3rd Army to break through the positions of the German 134th and 296th Infantry Divisions. By late on June 24 this had been achieved, with the Germans overwhelmed and the 9th Tank Corps exploiting to the rear. The 137th was given part of the credit for the liberation of the city of Bobruisk on June 29 and was awarded its name as an honorific. With the defenses of Army Group Center shattered, the division trekked westward towards Poland.

48th Army was transferred to 2nd Belorussian Front in the late autumn of 1944. During the Vistula-Oder Offensive the 137th pushed on through northern Poland before the army was once again transferred to 3rd Belorussian Front. The division fought in the East Prussian Offensive, and ended the war near Elbing.

Ten men of the division were named as Heroes of the Soviet Union, five of them posthumously. At the end of the war the men and women of the division carried the full title 137th Rifle, Bobryusk, Order of Suvorov Division. The division was part of the 42nd Rifle Corps, 48th Army of the 3rd Belorussian Front in May 1945.

On 12 May, the division was moved to Elbing for garrison duty. In late May, the older personnel of the division were demobilized. The division was ordered to disbanded in August 1945. Remaining personnel were demobilized or transferred to other units. The division was disbanded in the Baltic Military District on August 31, 1945.

References

Citations

Bibliography

Further reading
 Kiselyov, Valeriy «Заплачено кровью» "Paid in Blood"
 Kiselyov, Valeriy  «Последние журавушки» "Last Crane"
 Akulov, Ivan "Крещение" ("Baptism")

Infantry divisions of the Soviet Union in World War II
Military units and formations established in 1939
Military units and formations disestablished in 1945